Carla Namwali Serpell (born 1980) is an American and Zambian writer who teaches in the United States. In April 2014, she was named on Hay Festival's Africa39 list of 39 Sub-Saharan African writers aged under 40 with the potential and talent to define trends in African literature. Her short story "The Sack" won the 2015 Caine Prize for African fiction in English. In 2020, Serpell won the Belles-lettres category Grand Prix of Literary Associations 2019 for her debut novel The Old Drift.

Biography

Early years and education
Serpell was born in 1980 in Lusaka, Zambia, to Robert Serpell and his wife, Namposya Nampanya Serpell. Her British-Zambian father is a professor of psychology at the University of Zambia, and her mother was an economist. When she was nine, her family moved to Baltimore, Maryland, in the United States, where Serpell was educated. She completed her undergraduate degree in literature at Yale and her doctorate (PhD) in American and British fiction at Harvard. Serpell became an American citizen in 2017.

Career
Serpell is a professor of English at Harvard University. From 2008 to 2020, she was a professor of English at University of California, Berkeley. She resides in the United States and visits Lusaka annually.

Serpell's short story "Muzungu" was shortlisted in 2010 for the Caine Prize, an annual award for African short fiction in English. In 2011, she received the Rona Jaffe Foundation Writers' Award, a prize for beginning women writers. Her story "The Sack" won the Caine Prize in 2015. Saying "fiction is not a competitive sport", Serpell announced she would share the $15,000 prize with the other shortlisted writers, Masande Ntshanga, F. T. Kola, Elnathan John, and Segun Afolabi. She was the first Caine winner from Zambia. The "sack" of the title, according to Serpell, derives from a terrifying dream she had at 17, "and I didn't know if I was on the inside or the outside". It also has political implications: "I was studying American and British fiction, and [another graduate student] was studying African contemporary fiction, and her theory was that any time you saw a sack in African literature, it was a hidden reference to the transatlantic slave trade. I was kind of writing my story against that."

In 2014 Serpell published Seven Modes of Uncertainty, a critical work that examines "the relationship between literature's capacity to unsettle, perplex, and bewilder us, and literature's ethical value". The journal Novel: A Forum on Fiction called the book "a bravura performance".

Serpell is a contributor to the 2019 anthology New Daughters of Africa, edited by Margaret Busby. Serpell's "On Black Difficulty: Toni Morrison and the Thrill of Imperiousness" won the 2019 Brittle Paper Award for Essays & Think Pieces.

Serpell's debut novel, The Old Drift, was published in 2019. Reviewing it in The Guardian, Nadifa Mohamed wrote: "Namwali Serpell’s first novel is a rambunctious epic that traces the intertwined histories of three families over three generations. ...Serpell is an ambitious and talented writer, with the chutzpah to work on a huge canvas." The Observer's review concluded, "By the end, set in a near future involving a new digital device embedded in the user’s skin, we realise how slyly Serpell is testing our assumptions, before a cunning last-minute swerve forces us to question why we don’t consider science fiction a viable mode for the great African novel." 

In The Old Drift, Serpell experiments with different forms of narrative in order to help readers view the story from different viewpoints. NPR's Annalisa Quinn called Serpell's narrative style "florid, but the excess often comes with a point. These are indeed three ways humans think about space: As something legible and predictive, as a resource to exploit, and as a source of beauty and awe. You also get the sense that the descriptive excess is a conscious choice".

In March 2020, Serpell was one of eight writers to win a Windham–Campbell Literature Prize, one of the world's richest literary prizes, awarded annually, with each winner receiving $165,000. She was honored for fiction. The other winners were Yiyun Li; Maria Tumarkin and Anne Boyer for nonfiction; Bhanu Kapil and Jonah Mixon-Webster for poetry; and Julia Cho and Aleshea Harris for drama. Serpell said, "I'm absolutely thrilled to receive this award and honored to join the company of these esteemed writers. The Windham-Campbell Prize has proven unique in celebrating writing in Africa based solely on its literary achievement; it's deeply gratifying to be taken seriously as an artist."

Serpell won the 2020 Anisfield-Wolf Book Award in the Fiction category for The Old Drift. On 23 September 2020, it was announced that The Old Drift had also won the Arthur C. Clarke Award, the UK's top prize for science fiction. Serpell responded on Twitter on 25 September that she had received news of the award "within an hour of hearing that the cops who killed Breonna Taylor weren't charged. To honor Breonna and the ongoing fight against state-sanctioned violence, I'm donating the £2020 prize money to bail funds for protestors. Join me", explaining the reason for her show of solidarity in a BBC interview: "I've been trying to figure out how to acknowledge both the honor that this award grants to my novel and the feeling that the political revolution I'm describing in the novel is yet to come…My novel is not exactly prophetic. It is just resonant with the questions and issues that have been with me as part of the culture that has formed me. And that culture, I want to say, is one where science fiction is a force that lets us probe real urgent political questions about equality and power and justice."

Bibliography

Nonfiction 
 The Ethics of Uncertainty: Reading Twentieth-century American Literature, PhD dissertation, Harvard University, 2008, 
 Seven Modes of Uncertainty, Harvard University Press, 2014, 
Stranger Faces - Undelivered Lectures Series, 2020,978-1-945492-43-3 (paperback), 978-1945492-47-1 (ebook).

Novels 
 The Old Drift, Hogarth Press, 2019, 
 The Furrows, Hogarth Press, 2022,

Short stories 
"Account", in Enkare Review
"Double Men", in Reader, I Married Him, HarperCollins Publishers, 2016, 

 Ellah Wakatama Allfrey (ed.)

Awards and honors
In 2019, The Old Drift was included on The New York Times Book Review'''s  "100 Notable Books" list and TIME's "100 Must-Read Books of the Year" list.

Serpell's The Furrows, published in 2022 was a finalist for the National Book Critics Circle Award in Fiction and longlisted for the Joyce Carol Oates Prize. Publishers Weekly named The Furrows in their list of the top ten books of the year in any genre. Vulture also named The Furrows as one of its best books of 2022. It was selected for The New York Times''s "10 Best Books of 2022" list.

References

External links
 Namwali Serpell profile, University of California, Berkeley, English Department.
 Efemia Chela, "'I Write Out Of A Sense Of Curiosity.' An Interview With Namwali Serpell", Short Story Day Africa, 10 May 2017.

Living people
Rona Jaffe Foundation Writers' Award winners
Caine Prize winners
Zambian women writers
Yale University alumni
University of California, Berkeley faculty
Harvard University alumni
1980 births
21st-century Zambian writers
21st-century Zambian women writers